Rudyard Kipling (1865–1936) was a British author.

Kipling can also refer to

People
 John Lockwood Kipling (1837–1911), father of Rudyard Kipling
 Alice Kipling (1837–1910), mother of Rudyard Kipling

Places

Canada

Saskatchewan
 Kipling, Saskatchewan, a town in Saskatchewan
 Kipling Airport, an airport near Kipling, Saskatchewan

Toronto
 Kipling Avenue, a street in Toronto and York Region
 Kipling station, a station on the Toronto subway system
 Kipling GO Station, a GO Train commuter rail station in Toronto

United States 
 Kipling, Ohio, an unincorporated community in Center Township, Guernsey County, Ohio, United States
 Colorado State Highway 391, also known as Kipling Street

Other
 Mr Kipling, a brand of baked goods in the United Kingdom
 Kipling House, a boarding house at Haileybury and Imperial Service College, a public school near Hertford, England
 Harry Kipling, a character in 2000 AD, a British science-fiction comic
 HMS Kipling (F91), a British K-class destroyer named after the author and sunk in the Second World War
 Rudyard Kipling (ship), British steam trawler sunk in 1939
 Kipling (brand), Belgian bag brand
 Kipling (crater), a crater on planet Mercury
 Bagheera kiplingi, a species of jumping spider
 Willoughby Kipling, a fictional character by DC Comics

es:Kipling